The term "Asiatic Race" may refer to:
synonym of Asian race
Asian people
Mongoloid race 
Hamitic hypothesis (i.e. the "Asiatic" origin of North African peoples)
Asiatic race theory holds that the ancient Egyptians were the lineal descendants of the biblical Ham, through his son Mizraim.